Ferdinand Niedermeyer was a German fishing trawler that was requistioned in the Second World War by the Kriegsmarine for use as a vorpostenboot, serving as V 413 Ferdinand Niedermeyer. She was bombed and sunk off St. Peter Port, Guernsey, Channel Islands on 24 July 1944.

Description
The engine was made by Deschimag Seebeckwerft, Wesermünde. It was rated at 53nhp. The engine powered a single screw propeller.

History
Ferdinand Niedermeyer was built as yard number 439 by Deschimag Seebeckwerfte, Wesermünde for Grundmann & Gröschel, Wesermünde. She was launched on 18 September 1925 and completed in November. The Code Letters KRCJ were allocated, as was the fishing boat registration PG 367. In 1934, her Code Letters were changed to DEAB. In 1935, she was lengthened.

She was scheduled to take part in Unternehmen Seelöwe. On 23 May 1941, Ferdinand Niedermeyer was requisitioned by the Kriegsmarine for use as a vorpostenboot. She was allocated to 4 Vorpostenflotille as V 413 Ferdinand Niedermeyer. On 21 August 1944, she was sunk in the Bay of Biscay in an attack by Allied aircraft off Bayonne, Basses-Pyrénées, France. Also reported as sunk by Bristol Beaufighter aircraft of 236 Squadron, Royal Air Force and 404 Squadron, Royal Canadian Air Force off Le Verdon-sur-Mer, Gironde, France.

References

Sources

1925 ships
Ships built in Bremen (state)
Fishing vessels of Germany
Steamships of Germany
World War II merchant ships of Germany
Auxiliary ships of the Kriegsmarine
Maritime incidents in July 1944
World War II shipwrecks in the Atlantic Ocean
Shipwrecks in the Bay of Biscay
Ships sunk by British aircraft
Ships sunk by Canadian aircraft